The Miss Indiana competition is the pageant that selects the representative for the state of Indiana in the Miss America Pageant.

Elizabeth Hallal of Georgetown was crowned Miss Indiana 2022 on June 18, 2022 at STAR Bank Performing Arts Center in Zionsville. She competed for the title of Miss America 2023 at the Mohegan Sun Casino in Connecticut where she placed in the Top 7 along with winning a Preliminary Talent award.

Gallery of past titleholders

Results summary
The following is a visual summary of the past results of Miss Indiana titleholders at the national Miss America pageants/competitions. The year in parentheses indicates the year of the national competition during which a placement and/or award was garnered, not the year attached to the contestant's state title.

Placements
 Miss Americas: Katie Stam (2009)
 1st runners-up: Carol Mitchell (1952), Ann Garnier (1953), Barbara Mougin (1978), Nicole Rash (2008)
 2nd runners-up: Eileen Smith (1966), Shelli Yoder (1993)
 3rd runners-up: Pam Carlberg (1982)
 4th runners-up: Tommye Glaze (1961), Kit Field (1969), Rebecca Graham (1973), Tiffany Storm (1995)
 Top 5: Anna Howe (1927)
 Top 7: Elizabeth Hallal (2023)
 Top 10: Mary Haglund (1968), Penny Tichenor (1975), Cyndi Legler (1976), Laurie Broderick (1986), Shani Nielsen (1997), Julianne Hackney (1999), Bryn Chapman (2004)
 Top 12: MerrieBeth Cox (2013)
 Top 15: Helen Emly (1938), Tangra Riggle (2003), Nicole Pollard (2010), Lydia Tremaine (2019)
 Top 20: Allison Hatcher (2002)

Preliminary awards
 Preliminary Lifestyle and Fitness: Anita Hursh (1959), Rebecca Graham (1973), Shelli Yoder (1993) (tie), Tiffany Storm (1995), Katie Stam (2009)
 Preliminary Talent: Gloria Rupprecht (1958), Tommye Glaze (1961), Eileen Smith (1966), Mary Haglund (1968), Laurie Broderick (1986), Shani Nielsen (1997), Tangra Riggle (2003), Lydia Tremaine (2019), Elizabeth Hallal (2023)

Non-finalist awards
 Non-finalist Talent: Kathleen Burke (1962), Pat Patterson (1972), Sheila Stephen (1988), Sarah Wiley (2005), Gabrielle Reed (2011), Audra Casterline (2015)

Other awards
 Miss Congeniality: Debbie May (1971)
 Albert A. Marks Jr. Interview Award: Kelly Lloyd (2000)
 Bernie Wayne Talent Award: Tiffany Storm (1995), Shani Nielsen (1997)
 Evening Dress Award: Thelma Blossom (1922)
 Intercity Roller Chair Parade Award: Thelma Blossom (1922)
 Neat as a Pin Award: Pat Patterson (1972) (tie)
 Professional Beauty Award Third Prize: Sydney Nelson (1922)
 Quality of Life Award Finalists: Betsy Uschkrat (2007), Katie Stam (2009)

Winners

References

External links
 Miss Indiana official website

Indiana culture
Indiana
Women in Indiana
Recurring events established in 1922
1922 establishments in Indiana
Annual events in Indiana